Castle & Cooke, Inc., is a Los Angeles-based company that was once part of the Big Five companies in territorial Hawaii. The company at one time did most of its business in agriculture, including becoming, through mergers with the modern Dole Food Company, the world's largest producer of fruits and vegetables.  In 1995, it was spun off from Dole and today most of the company's business is in real estate and residential, commercial and retail development.

History 
Castle & Cooke was founded in 1851 as a partnership between Samuel Northrup Castle and Amos Starr Cooke as a department store that sold farm tools, sewing equipment, and medicine. Joseph Ballard Atherton joined as a clerk in 1858 and rose to become a partner by 1865. Over the next few decades, the company invested heavily in Hawaii's sugar industry, running plantations in Kohala and Haiku. Atherton became president after the deaths of Cooke in 1871 and Castle in 1894 when the company incorporated. After the death of Atherton, George Parmele Castle (1851–1932) became president. G. P. Castle retired in 1916 and Edward Davies Tenney became chairman.

In the 1910s, the company, along with three other Big Five companies, invested in Matson Navigation Company. Tenney became president of Matson after William Matson's death. In 1931, the company also bought a 21 percent share of the Hawaiian Pineapple Company, which was later renamed the Dole Food Company. After the death of Tenney, Alexander G. Budge became president in 1935.
Castle & Cooke bought the remaining shares of Dole in 1961.

Between 1964 and 1968, Castle & Cooke acquired the Standard Fruit Company, adding bananas and other tropical fruits to its existing pineapple operations. In 1978, it acquired Bud Antle Inc., a California-based lettuce and celery farmer; it was renamed Dole Fresh Vegetables in 1989.

The company maintained Dole's large pineapple plantations throughout the state, including a particularly large one on the island of Lanai, where Castle & Cooke owned about 95 percent of the island.

In the decades that followed, Castle & Cooke began to face severe financial trouble as Hawaii's agriculture industry weakened. In 1985, the company merged with the Flexi-Van Corporation, a transportation leasing company. In 1991, the company was renamed Dole Food Company.

In 1995, the real estate operations of The Dole Food Company were spun off as the newly reformed company Castle & Cooke. The new Castle & Cooke was bought by Dole's CEO, David H. Murdock, who remains the CEO of Castle & Cooke today.

On May 2, 2012 (made public in June), Oracle Corp. CEO Larry Ellison signed an agreement to buy most of the 6th largest Hawaiian island of Lanai from Castle & Cooke for $300 million.

In April 2016, a project in central Oahu that had faced extensive delays was approved by the Hawaii State Supreme Court. The Koa Ridge project aims to build 3,500 homes, which were initially valued at $300,000 each. The project broke ground in November 2017.

People 
 Charles Alden Black, executive

References

External links
Castle & Cooke
Castle & Cooke Hawaii
Dole Food Company history

Dole plc
Agriculture in Hawaii
Real estate services companies of the United States
Business in Hawaii
Companies based in Los Angeles
1851 establishments in Hawaii
American companies established in 1851
Food and drink companies established in 1851
Retail companies established in 1851
Conglomerate companies disestablished in 1991
1991 disestablishments in Hawaii
American companies established in 1995
Real estate companies established in 1995
1995 establishments in California
Overthrow of the Hawaiian Kingdom
Territory of Hawaii
Privately held companies based in California
1985 mergers and acquisitions
Re-established companies
Sugar plantations in Hawaii